Kaido Veermäe (born on 1 November 1971 Tallinn) is an Estonian actor and film director.

In 1996 he graduated from Estonian Academy of Music and Theatre's performing arts department. From 1996 until 1997 he was an actor at Vanalinnastuudio. Since 2002 he is a director at the film studio Rudolf Konimois Film.

Awards:
 1995: Voldemar Panso prize

Filmography

 1995: Wikmani poisid (television series)
 2002: Agent Sinikael (feature film; role: Solicitor)
 2004: Sigade revolutsioon (feature film; producer; in the role: Commander)
 2008: Tuulepealne maa (television series, role: Rein Salusoo)
 2010–2012: Kodu keset linna (television series, role: Paul)
 2011: Idioot (feature film; in the role: Ganja)

References

Living people
1971 births
Estonian male stage actors
Estonian male film actors
Estonian male television actors
21st-century Estonian male actors
Estonian film directors
Estonian Academy of Music and Theatre alumni
Male actors from Tallinn